The Temple of Kalabsha (also Temple of Mandulis) is an ancient Egyptian temple that was originally located at Bab al-Kalabsha (Gate of Kalabsha), approximately 50 km south of Aswan. 

In the 1960s the temple was relocated under the International Campaign to Save the Monuments of Nubia, and inscribed on the UNESCO World Heritage List in 1979, along with other outstanding examples of Nubian architecture including Abu Simbel and Amada.

History

The temple was situated on the west bank of the Nile River, in Nubia, and was originally built around 30 BC during the early Roman era. While the temple was constructed in Augustus's reign, it was never finished.  The temple was a tribute to Mandulis (Merul), a Lower Nubian sun god. It was constructed over an earlier sanctuary of Amenhotep II. 

The temple is 76 m long and 22 m wide in dimension. While the structure dates to the Roman period, it features many fine reliefs such as "a fine carving of Horus emerging from reeds on the inner curtain wall" of the temple. From Kalabsha's "sanctuary chambers, a staircase leads up to the roof of the temple" where one can see a splendid view of the temple itself and the sacred lake.  

Several historical records were inscribed on the temple walls of Kalabsha such as "a long inscription carved by the Roman Governor Aurelius Besarion in AD 250, forbidding pigs in the temple" as well as an inscription of "the Nubian king Silko, carved during the 5th century and recording his victory over the Blemmyes and a picture of him dressed as a Roman soldier on horseback." Silko was the Christian king of the Nubian kingdom of Nobatia.

When Christianity was introduced to Egypt, the temple was used as a church.

Movement

With help from Germany, the temple of Kalabsha was relocated after the Aswan High Dam was built, to protect it from the rising waters of Lake Nasser. The temple was moved to a site, located just south of the Aswan High Dam.  The process of moving the temple took more than two years. The temple of Kalabsha was the largest free-standing temple of Egyptian Nubia (after Abu Simbel, which was rock-cut, not free-standing) to be moved and erected at a new site. Although the building was never completed, it "is regarded as one of the best examples of Egyptian architecture in Nubia." 

In 1971, Egypt gave one of the temple's gates to the Federal Republic of Germany out of gratitude for Germany’s participation in the rescue of the Nubian temples. Since 1977 the gate has been located in the annex of Berlin's Egyptian Museum in Berlin-Charlottenburg. The gate will be moved to become the monumental entrance to the fourth wing of the Pergamon Museum in Berlin, which is currently being constructed.

Gallery of images

See also
Nubian architecture

References

External links

Archaeological sites in Egypt
Egyptian temples
International Campaign to Save the Monuments of Nubia
Conversion of non-Christian religious buildings and structures into churches
Persecution of pagans in the late Roman Empire
1st-century BC religious buildings and structures

de:Kalabscha
ru:Храм Калабша

(f) Le temple de Temple de Kalabasha sur Egypte eternelle.org